Dallas Contemporary, founded in 1978, is a contemporary art museum located in the Design District of Dallas, Texas.

Description
Dallas Contemporary is a non-collecting art museum presenting new and challenging ideas from regional, national and international artists. The institution is committed to engaging the public through exhibitions, lectures, educational programs, and events. The range and level of Dallas Contemporary’s programs serve audiences in the metropolitan Dallas-Fort Worth area and beyond.

Dallas Contemporary’s programs target the Dallas-Fort Worth area, while attracting audiences from the entire Southwest. It is the only bilingual institution in Texas dedicated to contemporary art and culture. The museum is open to the public Tuesday through Sunday, and admission is always free.

History

Patricia Meadows founded Dallas Contemporary, originally known as the D’Art Visual Arts Center, in 1978. In its original form, the museum hosted annual exhibitions of artwork created by its members and offered rental exhibition space to emerging artists. The museum evolved over the next few years to include exhibitions by nonmember artists from various regions around Texas. Dallas Contemporary eventually embraced the entire spectrum of contemporary art, placing Texas artists in a worldwide context. Today, Dallas Contemporary follows the European model of the kunsthalle, or art hall, a welcoming exhibition site for art of the moment. As a non-collecting institution, the museum commissions the creation of new artwork by emerging artists from all walks of life.

Building

Dallas Contemporary is housed in a 37,000 square foot building in the Design District, Dallas, an emerging neighborhood 1.5 miles north of downtown. Built in the 1950s, the building was used for a range of industrial purposes before being redesigned to fit the needs of the museum in 2010. Architect Edward M. Baum was responsible for renovating the space, transforming the structure into one of the largest kunsthalles in the United States.

The building’s inaugural owner was Grinnell Fire Protection. The building was later purchased by United Metal and converted into a steel-manufacturing plant that supplied steel to many of DFW’s high-rise buildings, ballparks, and roller coasters. Several industrial features still occupy the building’s interiors, including the original beams, roof trusses, sliding doors, floors and drains, as well a loading dock, dock leveler, and industrial weighing scale.

Featured exhibitions

Landmark exhibitions have featured renowned artists such as Nic Nicosia (2006); Vernon Fisher (2009); James Gilbert (2010); Michel Verjux (2011); Juergen Teller (2011); Rob Pruitt (2011); Inez Van Lamsweerde and Vinoodh Matadin (2012); Walter Van Beirendonck (2013); Richard Phillips (2014); Julian Schnabel (2014); Mario Testino (2014); Nate Lowman (2015); Nadia Kaabi-Linke (2015); David Salle (2015); and Yoshitomo Nara (2021).

Recent exhibitions have featured artists such as Aura Satz (2016); Jeff Zilm (2016); Dan Colen (2016); Helmut Lang (2016); Paola Pivi (2016); Laercio Redondo (2016); Pedro Reyes (2016); Bruce Weber (2016); John Houck (2016); Ross Bleckner (2016); Ambreen Butt (2017); Keer Tanchak (2017); Pia Camil (2017); McDermott and McGough (2017); Kiki Smith (2017); Jeremy Scott (2019); Alicja Kwade (2019); John Currin (2019); FriendsWithYou (2020); and Liu Xiaodong (2021). Thematic exhibitions include Black Sheep Feminism: The Art of Sexual Politics (2016) and Invisible Cities: Asian Moving Images (2017).

Dallas Contemporary has a history of mounting successful public art projects that engage the surrounding community. Over the past five years, the museum has commissioned various murals around the city, including extant works by Sour Grapes; Shepard Fairey; JM Rizzy; Michael Sieben; and FAILE. These murals can be found around the Design District, Trinity Groves, and Deep Ellum neighborhoods.

Learning programs
 
DC School Tours – Student experiences at Dallas Contemporary are grounded in close looking, inference, and inquiry. Through close examination and discussion, students are able to construct their own interpretation about a work of art. Guided tours seek to facilitate conversation, rather than lecture about facts and dates.

Chit Chat – Dallas Contemporary’s artist talk series engages learning though the art of conversation. Chit Chats increase dialogue, encourage debate, and stimulate exchange in visual art and culture. Dallas Contemporary actively supports the development of critical perspectives, as well as engages with issues that affect contemporary culture.

The Renaissance Programme – This nine-month internship was designed for emerging museum professionals who want to develop their knowledge in a supportive and creative environment. The Renaissance Programme adopts an interdisciplinary approach to museum practice, with focused projects surrounding exhibitions, education, development and events.

DC Summer Institute for Young Artists – Designed for middle and high school students, the DC Summer Institute for Young Artists allows participants to experiment with exciting art-making techniques, while discussing art with local, contemporary artists.

See also
Arts in Dallas, Texas
List of museums in North Texas
Museums in Dallas, Texas
MTV Staying Alive Foundation

References

External links 

Art museums and galleries in Texas
Arts in Dallas
Contemporary art galleries in the United States
Museums in Dallas
Art galleries established in 1978
1978 establishments in Texas
Education in Dallas
Tourist attractions in Dallas